José Luis Morales may refer to:
José Luis Morales (rower) (born 1950), Mexican Olympic rower
José Luis Morales (footballer, born 1973), Spanish retired football forward
José Luis Morales (footballer, born 1987), Spanish football winger for Levante